Palermo is a station on Line D of the Buenos Aires Underground in Palermo, Buenos Aires. It is located at the intersection of Avenida Santa Fe and Godoy Cruz. The station was opened on 23 February 1940 as the western terminus of the extension of Line D from Tribunales. On 29 December 1987, the line was extended to Ministro Carranza.

It is a transfer point for the Metrobús that runs along Juan B. Justo avenue and Palermo station on the San Martín Line commuter rail service.

References

External links

Buenos Aires Underground stations
1940 establishments in Argentina